Ream is a surname. Notable people with the surname include:

Dwight Ream (1892–1954), American football and basketball coach
Lilian Ream (1877-1961), English photographer 
Norman B. Ream (1844–1915), American businessman.
Roger Ream (born 1954), President of The Fund for American Studies
Tim Ream (born 1987), American soccer player
Vinnie Ream or Lavinia Ellen Ream Hoxie (1847–1914), American sculptor